Black Lives Matter Plaza (officially Black Lives Matter Plaza Northwest) is a two-block-long pedestrian section of 16th Street NW in downtown Washington, D.C. The plaza was renamed by Mayor Muriel Bowser on June 5, 2020, after the Department of Public Works painted the words "Black Lives Matter" in yellow,  capital letters, along with the D.C. flag, during the series of George Floyd protests taking place in the city.

History 
On June 5, 2020, during the series of George Floyd protests, the D.C. Department of Public Works painted the words "Black Lives Matter" in  yellow capital letters on 16th Street NW on the north of Lafayette Square, part of President's Park near the White House, with the assistance of the MuralsDC program of the Department of Public Works, with the D.C. flag accompanying the text. On the same date,  Mayor Muriel Bowser announced that part of the street outside of the White House had been officially renamed to Black Lives Matter Plaza posted with a street sign. When announcing the renaming, she said, "Breonna Taylor, on your birthday, let us stand with determination." In a press conference, she explained, "There are people who are craving to be heard and to be seen and to have their humanity recognized. We had the opportunity to send that message loud and clear on a very important street in our city." In October 2020, the DC City Council voted to keep the name permanently.

The naming of the street has been seen by many as not only a reaction to the protests but part of it.

Mayor Bowser's decision to rename the segment of 16th Street NW as a public gathering place, or plaza, followed DC precedent for the commemorative renaming of city streets, under the Code of the District of Columbia.

In September 2020, according to WUSA9, the Federal Highway Administration, Mayor Bowser's office and area business were engaged in talks about removing the lettering and street sign, although no formal request had been made by the federal government.

In Summer 2021, the yellow letters were temporarily painted over. Mayor Muriel Bowser stated that "right now we're undergoing a process to make the installation more permanent, and with lighting and landscaping and all the things that you expect an iconic art installation ... to install this piece of art with a very affirming message that not only our residents needed to hear, but people around the world needed to hear."

In October 2021, the street was reopened as a permanent installation featuring similar yellow lettering and a permanent concrete plaza. Unlike the original installation, which was closed to traffic, the permanent plaza includes one lane of traffic in each direction separated by a  pedestrian island in the center. Total construction costs are estimated at $7.8 million.

Location

The plaza is a two-block-long section of 16th Street NW, south of K St NW, extending through I St, and north of H Street NW on the north side of President's Park on the south side of the Downtown neighborhood in Northwest D.C.
Vehicular entry to the temporary installation was blocked by barricades on the right-hand side of the street, though emergency vehicles had access on the left side. After the completion of the permanent installation in October 2021, vehicular entry has been restored.

Reaction

Park police
The United States Park Police reacted to the public gatherers by erecting a temporary  chain-link security barrier on the north boundary of the park, which was used to post messages by the protesters.

Community response

The group Black Lives Matter DC criticized the renaming by calling the acts a "performative distraction from real policy changes." On June 6, protesters painted "Defund the Police" in the same yellow block letters that the city had painted "Black Lives Matter." Protesters also painted black the 3 stars on top of the DC City Crest so that from the air the lettering on the street reads "BLACK LIVES MATTER = DEFUND THE POLICE." The stars on the DC crest were subsequently re-added.

Legal challenges

Religious groups 
A group of religious organizations, including the Warriors for Christ and the Special Forces of Liberty, filed a federal lawsuit on June 12, 2020 against Bowser in the United States District Court for the District of Columbia over the renaming of the plaza. The suit contends that Black Lives Matter is a "cult for secular humanism" and a religious organization, and thus Bowser's action of renaming the plaza an endorsement of a religion violating the separation of church and state. The suit calls for the mural to be removed and the plaza to be renamed to a more secular name, as well as the display of different banners giving equal time for other groups, which include All Lives Matter, Blue Lives Matter, and "Green Lives Matter" for National Guardsmen.

The lawsuit was dismissed by Judge Trevor N. McFadden on August 21, 2020 without prejudice. A refiled case was similarly dismissed on July 12, 2021 by Judge McFadden.

Judicial Watch 
The conservative activist group Judicial Watch also filed suit against Mayor Muriel Bowser and the District Department of Transportation in response to the installation of Black Lives Matter Plaza. Arguing that the painting of the Black Lives Matter message created a public forum for expression, Judicial Watch requested permission to paint its slogan "Because No One Is Above the Law!" in a similar size on a District street. After the District government did not respond to its inquiries, the group sued in the U.S. District Court for the District of Columbia, alleging a violation of its First Amendment rights. The case remains pending before Judge Tanya S. Chutkan.

See also

 List of Black Lives Matter street murals
 Black Lives Matter Memorial Fence

References

External links

Satellite photograph of the original mural by Maxar Technologies

2020 establishments in Washington, D.C.
African-American history of Washington, D.C.
Black Lives Matter art
Downtown (Washington, D.C.)
George Floyd protests in Washington, D.C.
Murals in Washington, D.C.
Streets in Washington, D.C.
Squares, plazas, and circles in Washington, D.C.